Dion David Gales (born August 17, 1985) is an American former football defensive end for the Kansas City Chiefs of the National Football League.

Early life 
Gales was born in New Orleans and played football at John F. Kennedy High School. During high school, Gales received interest from Miami, LSU, Michigan State, and Ole Miss. Gales signed a letter of intent with the University of Mississippi but did not meet NCAA eligibility requirements and returned to Louisiana. Gales later played for Gulf Coast State College before joining the Troy Trojans.

Career 
Gales joined the Chiefs practice squad in September 2010 and the active roster on December 12, 2009. He was cut by the Chiefs on September 3, 2011.

External links
Kansas City Chiefs bio

References 

1985 births
Living people
Players of American football from New Orleans
American football defensive ends
Troy Trojans football players
Kansas City Chiefs players